1993–94 Alpenliga was the third season of the multi-national ice hockey league. 15 teams participated in the league, and HC Bozen won the championship by defeating AC Milano in the final.

Regular season

Playoffs

Semifinals 
 AC Milano (1) – HC Alleghe (4): 7:4 (3:1, 3:2, 1:1)
 HC Bozen (2) – EC Graz (3): 7:6 OT (2:3, 1:3, 3:0, 1:0)

3rd place 
 EC Graz (3) – HC Alleghe (4): 7:1 (3:1, 4:0, 0:0)

Final 
 AC Milano (1) – HC Bozen (2): 2:8 (0:3, 1:3, 1:2)

External links
 1993-94 season

Alpenliga seasons
2
Alpenliga
Alpenliga